The Bin Laden family, also spelled Bin Ladin, is a wealthy family intimately connected with the innermost circles of the Saudi royal family. It is the namesake and controlling shareholder of Saudi Binladin Group, a multinational construction firm. Following the September 11 attacks, the family became the subject of media attention and scrutiny through the activities of Osama bin Laden, the former head of the terrorist group al-Qaeda.

Beginnings
The family traces its origins to Awad bin Laden from the village of al-Rubat, in the Wadi Doan of the Tarim Valley, Hadramout governorate, Yemen. Awad's son was Mohammed bin Awad bin Laden (1908-1967). Mohammed bin Laden was a native of the Shafi'i (Sunni) Hadhramaut coast in southern Yemen, and emigrated to Saudi Arabia prior to World War I. He set up a construction company and came to Abdul Aziz ibn Saud's attention through construction projects, later being awarded contracts for major renovations in Mecca. He made his initial fortune from exclusive rights to construct all mosques and other religious buildings not only in Saudi Arabia, but as far as Ibn Saud's influence reached. Until his death, Mohammed bin Awad bin Laden had exclusive control over restorations at the Jami Al-Aqsa in Jerusalem. Soon, the bin Laden corporate network extended far beyond construction sites.

Mohammed's special intimacy with the monarchy was inherited by the younger bin Laden generation. Mohammed's sons attended Victoria College, Alexandria, Egypt. Their schoolmates included King Hussein of Jordan, Zaid Al Rifai, the Kashoggi brothers (whose father was one of the king's physicians), Kamal Adham (who ran the General Intelligence Directorate under King Faisal), present-day contractors Mohammed Al Attas, Fahd Shobokshi, Ghassan Sakr, and actor Omar Sharif.

When Mohammed bin Laden died in 1967, his son Salem bin Laden took over the family enterprises, until his own accidental death in 1988.

Family members
American and European intelligence officials estimate that all the relatives of the family may number as many as 600. In 1994, the bin Laden family disowned Osama bin Laden, and the Saudi government revoked his passport. The Saudi government also stripped Osama of his citizenship for publicly speaking out against the government for permitting U.S. troops to be based in Saudi Arabia in preparation for the 1991 Gulf War.

The groupings of the bin Laden family, based on the nationalities of the wives, include the most prominent "Saudi group", a "Syrian group", a "Lebanese group," and an "Egyptian group". The Egyptian group employs 40,000 people, most likely the country's largest private foreign investor. Osama bin Laden was born the only son of Muhammed bin Laden's eleventh wife, Hamida al-Attas, who was of Syrian origin, making Osama a member of the Syrian group.

First generation
 Mohammed bin Awad bin Laden (1908–1967) was the family patriarch and founder; before World War I, Mohammed, originally poor and uneducated, emigrated from Hadhramaut, on the south coast of Yemen, to the Red Sea port of Jeddah, Saudi Arabia, where he began to work as a porter. Starting his own business in 1930, Mohammed built his fortune as a building contractor for the Saudi royal family during the 1950s. Married 22 times, with 54 children, his 17th child was Osama bin Laden, who was the son of Hamida al-Attas (born in Syria), Mohammed's eleventh wife. The couple divorced soon after Osama was born, and Hamida was given in marriage to one of the executives of Mohammed's company around 1958. In 1967, Mohammed was killed in an airplane crash in Saudi Arabia when his pilot misjudged a landing.
 Muhammad al-Attas is Osama's stepfather in whose household Osama was raised at Jeddah, and worked at the bin Laden company. The couple had four children in addition to Osama: three boys and a girl, Fatima Mohammed al-Attas.
Abdallah bin Laden is the brother of Mohammed and the uncle of Osama; headed the Saudi Binladin Group (SBG); died in Medina, March 21, 2002, at age 75. He also had over 60 children and was married 6 times.

Second generation
 Salem bin Laden (1946–1988) attended Millfield, the English boarding school. He took over the family empire in 1967 upon the death of his father; also an amateur rock guitarist in the 1970s. He married an English art student, Caroline Carey, whose half-brother, Ambrose, is the son of the Marquess of Queensberry. Salem died outside San Antonio, Texas in 1988, when an experimental ultralight plane that he was flying got tangled in power lines.
 Tarek bin Laden (born 1947); once called "the personification of the dichotomy (conservatism and change) of Saudi Arabia".
 Bakr bin Laden (born 1946) succeeded Salem as the chairman of the Saudi Binladin Group; major power broker in Jeddah.
 Hassan bin Laden, senior vice president of the SBG.
 Yehia bin Laden, also active in the SBG; in 2001, owned 16 percent of Cambridge, MA-based Hybridon, Inc.
 Mahrous bin Laden, implicated in the Grand Mosque Seizure carried out by dissidents against the Saudi ruling family at the Masjid al-Haram in Makka on November 20, 1979. This event shook the Muslim world with the ensuing violence and the killing of hundreds at the holiest of Islamic sites. Trucks owned by the family were reported to have been used to smuggle arms into the tightly controlled city. The bin Laden connection was through the son of a Sultan of Yemen who had been radicalized by Syrian members of the Muslim Brotherhood. Mahrous was arrested for a time, but was not beheaded by the Saudi government alongside 63 others who were, with their public executions broadcast live on Saudi television. Later exonerated, he joined the family business and became manager of the Medina branch of the bin Laden enterprises and a member of the board.
 Osama bin Laden (born 1957 in Saudi Arabia, died May 2, 2011, in Pakistan) was a terrorist who co-founded the terrorism group Al-Qaeda, which was responsible for the attacks such as the 1998 United States embassy bombings, the 2002 Bali bombing, and most famously, the September 11 attacks. His death was announced on May 2, 2011. He was one of the FBI's Most Wanted Terrorists.
 Najwa Ghanem (born 1959), became the first wife of Osama in 1974. A first cousin, she was his mother's niece. She co-authored Growing Up bin Laden with her son Omar.
 Shaikha bint Laden (born 1960), half-sister of Osama, married Mohammed Jamal Khalifa. He was the founder of Benevolence International Foundation, in the Philippines in 1988. During this period, Khalifa is believed to have received large donations of cash from outside the country, some of which, intelligence officials suspect, may have been funneled to him by Al-Qaeda. He also ran the International Relations and Information Centre, by which embezzled money was funneled to Ramzi Yousef. In 1993, his business cards were found in the Jersey City, New Jersey apartment that Yousef stayed in while he was involved with the 1993 World Trade Centre bombing plot. Khalifa was first arrested on December 14, 1994, in Mountain View, California, placed in solitary confinement, and the contents of his luggage were logged and edited. In 1995, Khalifa was arrested in San Francisco on charges of violating United States immigration laws. He was detained while the Justice Department tried but failed to gather enough information to charge him in connection with suspected terrorist activities. Eventually, he was deported on May 5, 1995, to Jordan, which had an outstanding warrant for him on charges stemming from the bombing of movie theaters in Amman in 1994, for which he had been under a possible death sentence, convicted in absentia. His conviction was later overturned in a new trial, which resulted in an acquittal. In 1996, Khalifa returned to Saudi Arabia, where he was again arrested after 9/11, but later released. He lived in Saudi Arabia and was assassinated in 2007 in Madagascar.
 Yeslam bin Ladin (born 1950) studied in the 1970s at the University of Southern California, in Los Angeles; settled in Switzerland; became a Swiss citizen in 2001; Geneva-based head of the family's European holding company, the Saudi Investment Company; was scrutinized by Swiss and American investigators because of a financial stake he has in a Swiss aviation firm; he has claimed to not have had contact with Osama since 1981
 Abdullah bin Laden (born 1965); a graduate of Harvard Law School, Abdullah lived in Cambridge, Massachusetts on 9/11, and was the only Bin Ladin relative to remain in the United States, staying in Boston for almost a month following the attacks.
 Shafig bin Laden, the half-brother of Osama, was a guest of honour at the Carlyle Group's Washington conference at the Ritz-Carlton Hotel on September 11, 2001, and was among the 13 members of the bin Ladin family to leave the United States on September 19, 2001 aboard flight N521DB.

Third generation
 Wafah Dufour (born 1975), daughter of Yeslam bin Laden, is an American model and aspiring singer-songwriter. She spent the early part of her life in Jeddah, Saudi Arabia. Dufour, her little sisters Najia (1979) and Noor (1987), her mother (1954) and her father (1950) then moved to Geneva, Switzerland. In 1988, her parents separated. She earned a law diploma at Geneva Law School (Switzerland) and later a master's degree from Columbia Law School in the United States. She lived in Manhattan until around the time of the September 11, 2001 attacks, but was staying in Geneva for a summer holiday at the time of the attacks.
 Abdullah Osama bin Laden (born 1976), son of Osama and Najwa. He is reportedly residing in Saudi Arabia, and runs his own firm, called Fame Advertising, in Jeddah; he is closely watched by the Saudi government, which has restricted his travel from the kingdom since 1996; reportedly, he has never disowned his father.
Abdul Rahman bin Laden (born 1979), the second son of Osama and Najwa. As a child he was born with hydrocephalus, and his father took him to the United Kingdom for medical treatment. However, he refused to allow British surgeons to operate on the boy and tried to treat him himself using a folk remedy of honey. He ended up having an intellectual disability and autism. As an adult he moved to Syria with his mother in 2011. 
 Saad bin Laden (1979–2009) son of Osama and Najwa; Saad accompanied Osama on his exile to Sudan from 1991 to 1996, and then to Afghanistan. He was believed to be married to a woman from Yemen. Saad reportedly arrived in Iran in 2002 from Afghanistan, with a fake Iranian passport using the name Saad Mahmoudian. The customs officer immediately recognized that the passport was fake, and searched and questioned Saad briefly. He notified airport security but did not notify the Ministry of Intelligence and National Security of Iran (which is also responsible for identifying detained people at airports) as he was supposed to. As a result, the officer found nothing suspicious about his entrance and permitted him to leave Tehran. He was believed to have been heavily responsible for the bombing of a Tunisian synagogue on April 11, 2002. He was then implicated in the May 12, 2003, suicide bombing in Riyadh, and the Morocco bombing four days later. He was put under house arrest by the Iran government, but later escaped by January 2009 and fled to Pakistan. Saad was later killed in a U.S. drone strike in 2009. Al-Qaeda leader Ayman al-Zawahiri confirmed Saad's death in a videotape three years later.
 Omar bin Laden (born 1981) son of Osama and Najwa; Omar accompanied Osama on his exile to Sudan from 1991 to 1996, and then to Afghanistan. He returned to Saudi Arabia after an apparent falling-out with his father over Omar's disagreement with violence. For a while, Omar ran his own company in Jeddah as a contractor. Omar has one son, Ahmed, by his ex-wife, whom he had divorced 3 times by 2006. In September 2006, he married Zaina and they are now said to be living in a secret location in Qatar. He is now reported to be living in Normandie, France, with his wife.
 Mohammad bin Osama bin Laden (born 1983), the son of Osama and Najwa, married the daughter of al-Qaeda leader Mohammed Atef in January 2001, at Kandahar, Afghanistan, with footage broadcast by Al-Jazeera, where three of Osama's step-siblings and Osama's mother were in attendance.
 Hamza bin Laden (1989–2017/2019), also the son of Osama, was groomed to be Osama's heir following Saad's death. On February 28, 2019, the U.S. State Department offered a reward of up to $1 million for information on Hamza bin Laden's whereabouts. The announcement described Hamza bin Laden as a "key leader" of Al-Qaeda who had released audio and video messages on the internet calling for attacks on the U.S. and its western allies to avenge his father's killing. On July 31, 2019, it was reported that Hamza bin Laden was believed to have been killed in the first two years of the Trump administration, which began on January 20, 2017. On September 14, 2019, U.S. President Donald Trump confirmed that Hamza bin Laden was killed in a U.S. counter-terrorism operation in the Afghanistan/Pakistan region. Other details were not disclosed.
 Khaled bin Laden, son of Osama, was killed along with his father at Abbottabad, Pakistan, May 2, 2011.
 Abdul Aziz bin Laden, manages SBG's Egyptian operations; ranked Number 2 in the 2006 UAE National Superstock Bike Championship.

Family tree

Mohammed bin Awad bin Laden's sons
Mohammed bin Awad bin Laden's (1908–1967) known sons:

 Salem bin Laden (d. 1988) married Caroline Carey
 Ali bin Laden
 Thabet bin Laden (d. 2009)
 Mahrous bin Laden
 Hassan bin Laden
 Bakr bin Laden
 Khalid bin Laden
 Yeslam bin Ladin (born 1950) married Carmen bin Ladin (born 1954)
 Wafah Dufour (born 1978)
 Najia Dufour (born 1979)
 Noor Dufour (born 1987)
 Ghalib bin Laden
 Yahya bin Laden
 Omar bin Laden
 Abdul Aziz bin Laden
 Issa bin Laden
 Tarek bin Laden
 Ahmed bin Laden
 Ibrahim bin Laden
 Shafiq bin Laden
 Osama bin Laden (d. 2011) married Najwa Ghanem (born 1960)
 Khalil bin Ladin
 Saleh bin Ladin
 Haider bin Laden
 Saad bin Laden
 Abdullah bin Laden
 Yasser bin Laden
 Mohammad bin Laden (born 1967)

Osama bin Laden's children
Osama bin Laden's known children, from his respective wives, include:

 by Najwa Ghanem:
Abdallah bin Laden (born 1976)
 Abdul Rahman bin Laden (born 1978)
 Saad bin Laden (1979–2009), killed in a drone strike in Pakistan's tribal region in 2009.
 Omar bin Laden (born 1981), married Zaina Alsabah-Bin Laden 2006 to date.
 Osman bin Laden (born 1983)
 Mohammed bin Osama bin Laden (born 1985)
 Fatima bin Laden (born 1987)
 Iman bin Laden (born 1990)
 Laden "Bakr" bin Laden (born 1993)
 Roqaya bin Laden (born 1997)
 Nour bin Laden (born 1999)
 by Khadijah Sharif:
 Ali bin Laden (born 1986)
 Amer bin Laden (born 2005)
 Aisha bin Laden (born 1992)
 by Khairiah Sabar:
 Hamza bin Laden (1989–late 2010s)
 by Siham Sabar:
 Khalid bin Laden (1988–2011), killed during the Navy SEAL raid in Abbottabad, Pakistan.
 Kadhija bin Laden (1988–2007), died in childbirth in Pakistan's tribal region, according to al-Qaeda leader Ayman al-Zawahiri.
 Miriam bin Laden (born 1990)
 Sumaiya bin Laden (born 1992)

Bin Laden flights
At least 13 relatives of Osama bin Laden, accompanied by bodyguards and associates, left the United States on a chartered flight with Ryan International Airlines (Ryan International Flight 441), eight days after the September 11, 2001, terrorist attacks, according to a passenger manifest released on July 21, 2004. The passenger list was made public by Senator Frank Lautenberg (D-NJ), who obtained the manifest from officials at Boston's Logan International Airport. None of the flights, domestic or international, took place before the reopening of national airspace on the morning of September 13 and the 9/11 Commission found "no evidence of a political intervention".

Among the passengers with the bin Laden surname were Omar Awad bin Laden, who had lived with Osama's nephew Abdallah Awad bin Laden, who was involved in forming the U.S. branch of the World Assembly of Muslim Youth in Alexandria, and Shafig bin Laden, a half brother of Osama's who was reportedly attending the annual investor conference of the Carlyle Group. Also on board was Akberali Moawalla, an official with the investment company run by Yeslam bin Ladin, another of Osama bin Laden's half brothers. Records show that a passenger, Kholoud Kurdi, lived in Northern Virginia with a bin Laden relative.

The bin Laden flight has received fresh publicity because it was a topic in Michael Moore's controversial documentary Fahrenheit 9/11.

The 9/11 Commission found that the "FBI conducted a satisfactory screening of Saudi nationals who left the United States on charter flights. The Saudi government was advised of and agreed to the FBI's requirements that passengers be identified and checked against various databases before the flights departed. The Federal Aviation Administration representative working in the FBI operations center made sure that the FBI was aware of the flights of Saudi nationals and was able to screen the passengers before they were allowed to depart."

References

Further reading

 
 Bin Laden's daughter free to leave Tehran: Iran FM (AFP December 25, 2009)

 
Business families
Saudi Arabian families